What the Tudors Did for Us is a 2002 BBC documentary series that examines the impact of the Tudor period on modern society.

Episodes

Episode one: Seeing the World

Hart-Davis travels around Britain to introduce the idea and inventions of the Tudor Age in art, optics and exploration.

 Wad (graphite) discovered by shepherds in the mid 16th century was used as the first pencil leading to life drawing and realistic portraiture.
 The lens was added to the camera obscura by Giambattista della Porta in Natural Magic leading to fine arts and the first cinema.
 Mainland North America was discovered by John Cabot and possibly named after his investor Richard Americ.
 The first atlas (flat map) was drawn by Gerardus Mercator using the Mercator projection demonstrated by Hart-Davis.
 The first British colony in America was founded by Sir Walter Raleigh at Roanoke opening the New World to the Tudors.
 The perspective glass invented by Leonard Digges and demonstrated by Hart-Davis may have been the first telescope.

Episode two: The Thinkynge Revolution

Hart-Davis travels around Britain to introduce the idea and inventions of the Tudor Age in science, literature and education.

 The first printing press, like the one recreated at St Bride Printing Library, was brought to England by William Caxton.
 The resulting printing revolution included William Tyndale's English bible that lead to the standardisation of the English language.
 State education was founded by Henry VIII providing opportunities for Christopher Marlowe and William Harvey amongst others.
 Human anatomy was revolutionised by Andreas Vesalius following the legalisation of human dissection by Henry VIII.
 Modern medicine began from the Swiss Alchemist Paracelsus' belief that minerals and chemicals could be used to treat diseases.
 Observational science came of age when Thomas Diggs recorded the first observation of a supernova.

Episode three: The Goode Lyfe

Hart-Davis travels around Britain showing how domestic life developed during Tudor times.

 Interior design, using the example of Hardwick Hall: the layout of separate rooms with dedicated functions – instead of one great hall, upholstered furniture, wallpaper, carpets, and windows.
 The invention of the flush toilet by John Harington.
 The foundation of the Royal Exchange, London by Sir Thomas Gresham, and in particular the associated two floors of shops, characterised as the world's first mall.
 The popularising of sports including real tennis and horse racing.
 Adding hops to small beer thereby increasing the alcohol content.
 The invention of the knitting machine by William Lee.

Episode four: War Machyne

References

External links 
 
 BBC Worldwide playlist for the series on YouTube.

2002 British television series debuts
2002 British television series endings
2000s British documentary television series
2000s British television miniseries
BBC television documentaries about history during the 16th and 17th centuries
English-language television shows